Benjamin Webb may refer to:

 Benjamin Webb (clergyman) (1819–1885), English clergyman
 Benjamin Joseph Webb (1814–1897), United States senator, historian, and editor

See also
Ben Webb (disambiguation)
Benji Webbe (born 1967), Welsh singer